Willie James Burton Jr. (born 24 June 1962) is an American-New Zealand former professional basketball player who spent 19 seasons playing in the New Zealand National Basketball League (NBL). Burton came to New Zealand in the mid-1980s to play for Palmerston North and became a league legend. He kept himself in great shape and was still playing top basketball when he turned 40. He won six rebounding titles and ranks as the league's all-time leader around the boards. He finished his career with 4,244 career rebounds, nearly 1,500 rebounds more than the next best individual rebounding total.

Early life and career
Burton grew up playing baseball in his hometown of Millen, Georgia. Lanky, flexible and possessing lightning reflexes, Burton stood head and shoulders above others as a "cornerman" for his team at the age of 12. His father, Willie James Sr., was a keen baseball player, but Burton was not so much. Luckily for Burton, a friend, Alonzo Holmes, lived down the road in his neighbourhood and introduced him to basketball. He went on to play four years of college basketball for the University of Tennessee between 1980 and 1984. He appeared in 111 games for the Volunteers over his career, and averaged a team-high 13.5 points per game as a senior in 1983–84. He also led the team in rebounds per game as a junior and senior (8.1 and 7.3 per game respectively), and blocks per game as a sophomore and junior (1.3 and 0.8 per game respectively).

Following his senior season with Tennessee, Burton was selected in the sixth round of the 1984 NBA draft by the Denver Nuggets. He subsequently attended training camp with the Nuggets, but he did not make the final roster cut.

College statistics

|-
| align="left" | 1980–81
| align="left" | Tennessee
| 14 || 0 || 5.0 || .524 || .000 || .333 || 1.9 || .0 || .4 || .4 || 1.7
|-
| align="left" | 1981–82
| align="left" | Tennessee
| 30 || 30 || 26.1 || .511 || .000 || .667 || 5.4 || 1.3 || .9 || 1.3 || 5.6
|-
| align="left" | 1982–83
| align="left" | Tennessee
| 32 || 32 || 34.2 || .498 || .000 || .705 || 8.1 || 2.7 || 1.2 || .8 || 9.1
|-
| align="left" | 1983–84
| align="left" | Tennessee
| 35 || 35 || 34.4 || .523 || .000 || .765 || 7.3 || 2.2 || 1.3 || .6 || 13.5
|- class="sortbottom"
| style="text-align:center;" colspan="2" | Career
| 111 || 97 || 28.4 || .513 || .000 || .716 || 6.3 || 1.8 || 1.1 || .8 || 8.6

NBL career
In 1985, Burton moved to New Zealand and joined the Palmerston North Jets of the National Basketball League (NBL). In his first season, he averaged 28.6 points and a league-high 16.1 rebounds per game. He continued on with the Jets in 1986 before joining the Hawke's Bay Hawks in 1987. After two seasons with the Hawks, he returned to Palmerston North, playing for them in 1989 and 1990. In 1991, he joined New Plymouth and played three seasons for the team before returning to Hawke's Bay in 1994 where he spent the next four years. After playing in the second division competition for the North Otago Penguins in 1998, he returned to Palmerston North for a third stint in 1999, but again re-joined the Hawks just two seasons later. Burton retired following the 2002 season, but came out of retirement in 2005 to help the Hawks reach the grand final, where they were defeated by the Auckland Stars by one point. He played one final season in 2006, this time winning his first and only championship with an 85–69 win in the grand final over Auckland. He retired for a second time following the 2006 season, departing the NBL after 19 seasons.

Burton finished his NBL career as an eight-time All-Star Five honouree and a six-time rebounding champion. He was also named Most Outstanding Forward in 1989, and after gaining New Zealand citizenship in the mid-90s, he was named Most Outstanding Kiwi Forward/Centre in 1997. As evidence of his all-round game, he also won the league assist title in 1999 with 5.6 assists per game. His 4,244 career rebounds ranks first on the league's all-time rebounding list.

After retiring from playing, Burton continued on as an assistant coach with the Hawks, while also coaching the Hawke's Bay under 15, 17 and 19 men's teams.

National team career
Burton's all-round game made him an ideal substitute off the bench for Tall Black captain Pero Cameron when he was selected to play for New Zealand at the 2001 Goodwill Games at the age of 39. He then played a crucial part in the historic series victory over Australia later that year. Burton was still in the selection mix for the 2002 FIBA World Championship, but was replaced by Ed Book as the team's one allowable naturalised player following the team's series against Hungary.

Personal
Burton and his wife Suzanne, a New Zealander, have two sons, Alonzo and Dominique. Alonzo followed in his father's footsteps and joined the Hawke's Bay Hawks in 2012.

References

External links
Basketball New Zealand profile
Tennessee Volunteers' 1982–83 roster
2006 FIBA.com article on Burton

1962 births
Living people
African-American basketball players
American expatriate basketball people in New Zealand
Basketball players from Georgia (U.S. state)
Denver Nuggets draft picks
Hawke's Bay Hawks players
Power forwards (basketball)
Tennessee Volunteers basketball players
American men's basketball players
Competitors at the 2001 Goodwill Games
21st-century African-American people
20th-century African-American sportspeople